Studholme is a hamlet in the English county of Cumbria.

Studholme is located about a mile north-west of the village of Little Bampton.

External links 

Hamlets in Cumbria
Kirkbampton